Ablabera analis is a species of beetle first discovered by Carl Peter Thunberg in 1818. No sub-species are listed in the Catalogue of Life.

References

Melolonthinae
Beetles described in 1818